Punk Rock Songs (The Epic Years) is a compilation album by Bad Religion, released in 2002. All songs on this compilation are from their tenure on Atlantic and Epic Records from 1994 to 2000, in addition to four live tracks and both the English and German versions of "Punk Rock Song". Punk Rock Songs was released by Epic without any input from the band members, as Bad Religion had already returned to Epitaph Records, and as of 2017, it has not been released in the United States.

Background
While the first Bad Religion compilation album All Ages contains material from their 1982 debut How Could Hell Be Any Worse? to 1992's Generator, Punk Rock Songs almost takes off from that point, including material from Stranger than Fiction (1994) up through The New America (2000). It was during this period of their career that Bad Religion had risen in popularity. Like All Ages, Punk Rock Songs contains live tracks and omits anything from Recipe for Hate, which was released between Generator and Stranger than Fiction.

Although this compilation album was released after The Process of Belief, it contains no songs from that album as Bad Religion had switched record labels by that time.

Track listing
 "Punk Rock Song"
 "The Gray Race"
 "The Streets of America"
 "A Walk"
 "Ten in 2010"
 "New America"
 "I Love My Computer"
 "It's A Long Way to the Promise Land"
 "Hear It"
 "Raise Your Voice" (with Campino of Die Toten Hosen)
 "No Substance"
 "Infected"
 "21st Century (Digital Boy)"
 "Stranger Than Fiction"
 "Dream of Unity"
 "Punk Rock Song" (German Version)
 "Leave Mine to Me" (Live)
 "Change of Ideas" (Live)
 "Slumber" (Live)
 "Cease" (Live)
On the Japanese and German releases, there are some extra tracks:
 "We're Only Gonna Die" (with Biohazard) (Live)
 "The Henchman '98" (Live)
 "The Answer" (Live)
 "The Universal Cynic" (Ithaca Session)
 "The Dodo" (Ithaca Session)

Bad Religion albums
2002 greatest hits albums
Epic Records compilation albums